Nižné Nemecké is a village and municipality in the Sobrance District in the Košice Region of east Slovakia.
The name of the village literally means "Germans of the lower" e.g. German women/things living/positioned in a lower area/village, where Germans is an adjective in the feminine or neuter gender.

History
In historical records the village was first mentioned in 1353. During the Slovak-Hungarian War this village was a target of shelling and bombing by Hungarian forces.

Geography
The village lies at an altitude of 110 metres and covers an area of 7.246 km².
It has a population of 333 people.

Culture
The village has a library and a soccer pitch.

External links
 
https://web.archive.org/web/20070513023228/http://www.statistics.sk/mosmis/eng/run.html
http://en.e-obce.sk/obec/niznenemecke/nizne-nemecke.html

Villages and municipalities in Sobrance District